The label Progressive-Conservative was used by some candidates for the House of Commons of Canada in the 1925, 1926, 1930 and 1935 federal elections. The term probably indicates that these candidates were supporters of both the Progressive Party of Canada and the Conservative Party.

In 1942, the Conservative Party renamed itself the Progressive Conservative Party of Canada when the former Progressive Premier of Manitoba, John Bracken, became the party leader.  Most Progressives, however, had previously joined the Liberal Party of Canada.

The only Progressive-Conservative candidate to be elected to the House of Commons was Errick Willis.

Willis first sought election to the House of Commons of Canada in the 1926 federal election as a Progressive-Conservative candidate in the riding of Souris, Manitoba. He was defeated by Progressive candidate James Steedman, who won 6,105 votes to Willis’ 4,946 votes.

In the 1930 federal election, Willis, again running as a "Progressive-Conservative" defeated Steedman 6,252 to 5,780.

After serving in the Conservative back-benches for five years, Willis sought re-election as a "Progressive-Conservative", but was defeated in the 1935 federal election by George William Macdonald, running as a Liberal-Progressive candidate.  Willis lost by only three votes, placing second out of four candidates, with 4,501 votes (42.5% of the total).

Willis later became leader of the Manitoba Conservative Party in 1936, and served until 1954, by which time it had taken the name, "Progressive Conservative Party of Manitoba".

See also
 List of political parties in Canada

Federal political parties in Canada